Events in the year 2021 in Vietnam.

Incumbents
 Communist Party General Secretary: Nguyễn Phú Trọng
 President: Nguyễn Phú Trọng → Nguyễn Xuân Phúc
 Prime Minister: Nguyễn Xuân Phúc → Phạm Minh Chính
 Assembly Chairperson: Nguyễn Thị Kim Ngân → Vương Đình Huệ

Events

Ongoing 
COVID-19 pandemic in Vietnam

January 
January 31 – Nguyễn Phú Trọng is re-elected as General Secretary of the Communist Party of Vietnam for a third five year term of top leader in Vietnam.

May 
May 23 - 2021 Vietnamese legislative election

July 
July 8 - Officials decided to postpone 2021 SEA Games to 2022 due to the ongoing COVID-19 pandemic in Vietnam.
July 23 to August 2 - Vietnam at the 2020 Summer Olympics

August
August 24 to September 5 - Vietnam at the 2020 Summer Paralympics

Deaths

15 January – Lệ Thu, singer (born 1943).
14 February – Nguyễn Tài Thu, physician (born 1931).

References

 

 
2020s in Vietnam
Years of the 21st century in Vietnam
Vietnam
Vietnam